Glory is the ninth studio album by American singer Britney Spears, released on August 26, 2016, through RCA Records. After renewing her contract with RCA, Spears began work on the album in 2014. Lacking a deadline for completion, she continued work into 2015 and 2016, which, according to Spears, provided her with the opportunity to create one of her favorite albums in her catalog. Primarily a pop record, it also contains elements of R&B, EDM, and hip hop music.

Glory received positive reviews. Music critics praised the album's production, Spears's vocal performance on the album and cited it amongst her best records. It was included on year-end lists of best albums by several publications. Though underperforming commercially compared to Spears's other albums, Glory debuted at number three on the Billboard 200, becoming her ninth consecutive top five album in the United States. It topped the charts in the Czech Republic, Ireland, Italy, and also peaked within the top five of charts in another 20 countries.

"Make Me" was released as the lead single for the record on July 15, 2016. The single debuted and peaked at number 17 on the US Billboard Hot 100. "Slumber Party" was released as the second single on November 16, 2016, and peaked at number 86 on the US Billboard Hot 100. Glory was further promoted with three promotional singles—"Private Show", "Clumsy", and "Do You Wanna Come Over?", which premiered in the weeks prior to the album's debut. Spears promoted the album with television appearances and televised performances, including the 2016 MTV Video Music Awards.

Glory was reissued twice in 2020; the standard edition reissue was released on May 29, and the deluxe edition reissue was released on December 4. "Mood Ring (By Demand)" was released as the album's third single on July 10, 2020, almost four years after the album's original release; "Swimming in the Stars" was released as the fourth single on December 2, 2020; "Matches" was released as the fifth and final single on December 18, 2020.

Recording and production 

In August 2014, Spears announced she had renewed her contract with RCA Records, and that she was writing and recording new music. The recording process for the album took two and a half years and "30–40" songs were recorded for the record. Six months into the recording of the album, Spears was dissatisfied with the results. Karen Kwak was then brought onto the record as executive producer following the release of "Pretty Girls" and helped Spears find "the most fun people to write with". Kwak wanted to recall the sounds of Spears's albums Blackout (2007) and In the Zone (2003) for Glory, and chose producers based on this. Kwak said of the album: "Britney pursued the songs she wanted to do for herself. She came up with concepts and melodies. It's her baby." In an interview with Billboard in March 2015, Spears said that she was working on a new album "slowly but surely."

In April 2015, Matthew Koma confirmed he had worked on material for the record, none of which made the final cut. In June 2015, Spears was pictured working with Sam Bruno, however, none of this material ended up on the record. In July 2015, Spears was pictured working with writers Chantal Kreviazuk and Simon Wilcox alongside producer Ian Kirkpatrick; in that same month, DJ Mustard announced that he was working on the album, later revealed to be "Mood Ring" which was recorded the previous month. Spears was also pictured working with producer Alex da Kid in July 2015, however, his contributions did not make the cut for the album. In October 2015, Spears was pictured working in the studio with Burns and Mischke. Later that month, Spears teased the title for "Just Luv Me". In November 2015, Spears was pictured working in the studio with Justin Tranter and Julia Michaels.

In March 2016, Spears said that she was "being more hands-on" with the album and that it is "the best thing I've done in a long time," though she noted that she did not know when the album would be finished and that she was "not rushing anything [...] so that my fans will truly appreciate it." The final track recorded for the album was "Love Me Down". On Most Requested Live with Romeo, Spears revealed that it was her son who chose the title of the album.

Music and lyrics 
Since the beginning of the album's recording process, Spears insisted that she wanted to do something different with the project and take a "left turn." During a Tumblr Q&A with fans in July 2016, when asked about the style of the album, Spears responded with "I'll just say this... We really explored some new things." On August 5, she revealed in a phone-in radio interview on the segment On Air with Ryan Seacrest that the album "took a lot of time, but I think we brought it to a level where I was really, really happy with what I had; it's cool, it's really different [...] there are like two or three songs that go in the direction of more urban that I've wanted to do for a long time now, and I just haven't really done that."

Glory is primarily a pop, R&B, and dance-pop record with influences of EDM and hip hop.

Release and promotion 

On August 3, 2016, Spears unveiled the album's release date, the title and the album cover–which was a photograph taken by Randee St. Nicholas on the set of the music video for "Make Me"–and that her new song "Private Show" would be instantly made available for digital download to those who pre-ordered the album via iTunes Store.

Glory was released on August 26, 2016. On August 3, Spears appeared on Jimmy Kimmel Live!, pranking Jimmy Kimmel with an impromptu bedside performance of "Make Me" alongside male dancers. On August 5, Spears was interviewed for the radio program On Air with Ryan Seacrest, where she discussed the development of the album. On August 16, Spears announced that she would be performing "Make Me" at the 2016 MTV Video Music Awards. The performance was announced following the cancellation of two Britney: Piece of Me show dates that were initially scheduled two days prior to the awards. The performance was her first at the VMAs since her 2007 performance of "Gimme More". On August 24, Spears was interviewed on BBC's Scott Mills. On August 25, Spears appeared on the "Carpool Karaoke" segment on The Late Late Show with James Corden where she sang along to "Make Me", "Oops!... I Did It Again", "Womanizer", "Toxic" and "...Baby One More Time". On August 29, the day after the VMAs, she was interviewed on the Elvis Duran and the Morning Show and the Zach Sang Show. On September 1, Spears appeared for the first time in fifteen years on Today for an interview and to perform "Make Me" and "Do You Wanna Come Over?".

On September 7, 2016, Spears appeared on The Ellen DeGeneres Show, where she went with Ellen DeGeneres to the mall and distributed signed copies of Glory. On September 24, Spears performed at the 2016 iHeartRadio Music Festival at the T-Mobile Arena, which aired on The CW. On September 27, Spears performed at the Apple Music Festival in London. On October 1, Spears appeared on The Jonathan Ross Show for an interview and to perform "Make Me", marking her first performance on British TV since 2008. On December 2, Spears performed at 102.7 KIIS FM's Jingle Ball. She received a birthday cake and performed "Slumber Party" with Tinashe. The following day, she performed at 99.7 NOW's Triple Ho Show. On December 10, Spears performed at the B96 Pepsi Jingle Bash.

Singles 

"Make Me" was released as the lead single for the album on July 15, 2016. It was described as a "slinky" mid-tempo R&B song and features the vocal collaboration of American rapper G-Eazy. An accompanying music video for the single premiered on Vevo on August 5, 2016. The single debuted and peaked at number 17 on the Billboard Hot 100, becoming her sixth-highest debut on the chart and 34th Hot 100 entry.

A remix version of "Slumber Party" featuring Tinashe was released on November 18, 2016, as the second single. Its official music video also premiered the same day and has accumulated over a hundred million views on YouTube. The single debuted at number 86 on the Billboard Hot 100 issue dated December 10, 2016, becoming her 35th chart entry. Both "Make Me" and "Slumber Party" reached the summit of the Billboard Dance Club Songs chart.

"Private Show" was released as the first promotional single along with the pre-order on August 4, 2016. The song shares the title of her then-latest fragrance. The song was written by Spears, Carla Williams, Tramaine Winfrey and Simon Smith. "Clumsy" was released as the second promotional single on August 11, 2016. The third and final promotional single "Do You Wanna Come Over?" was released on August 18, 2016.

Critical reception 

Glory received generally positive reviews from critics. At Metacritic, the album received an average score of 71, indicating "generally positive reviews", based on fourteen reviews. Sal Cinquemani from Slant Magazine rated the album 3.5 out of 5 stars, and called the album's sound "daring and mature", but criticized "Private Show", calling it "the album's only bona-fide misfire." In a positive review, Maura Johnston from The Boston Globe described the album as one with "an unbridled energy" that "operates on its own terms." Neil McCormick from The Daily Telegraph praised the production on the album, and noted that "every track sounds like a single". In a mixed review of the album, Jon Parales from The New York Times claimed that the album was "one-dimensional", but noted her as sounding like she "has emphatically returned to the foreground." Mesfin Fekadu from Associated Press noted Spears "has taken note and jumped on the bandwagon [of R&B]" but claimed that the songs were not "authentically Britney." In contrast, Nolan Feeney from Entertainment Weekly characterized the songs on the album as sounding "like glimpses of the real Britney—her musical tastes, her voice—imperfections and all."

In particular, Spears's vocals were generally praised. The Los Angeles Times described the vocals as a "vast improvement" over those on Britney Jean, remarking that "the very performed nature of the singing [...] makes Glory such a good time." The Boston Globe remarked that Spears was "throwing herself fully into her vocal performance" on the album and The New York Times described Spears as sounding "more involved, more present, than she has in a decade." Rolling Stone positively compared Spears's vocals to those on In the Zone, noting "she hasn't played around with her vocals so cleverly since the "Toxic" days." Entertainment Weekly described the album as "her most engaging vocally" in a decade and noted Spears as sounding "more present and enthusiastic than she has in years." In a similar sentiment, Idolator described Spears as sounding "more lucid, engaged and front-and-center than she's been in years." Slant Magazine credited Spears with a "willingness to stretch vocally and explore new sonic terrain", but also remarked that at times, this "highlight[s] her shortcomings".

Accolades

Commercial performance 
Glory debuted at number three on the US Billboard 200, moving 111,000 album-equivalent units,
an increase in sales as compared to her last studio album, Britney Jean (2013), which sold 107,000 copies in its first week. The record became Spears's tenth top five album in the nation. As of May 2020, the album has sold 157,000 copies in the United States. On the Canadian Albums Chart compiled by Billboard, the record debuted at number four, becoming her ninth top five album in the country.

In the United Kingdom, Glory debuted at number two, becoming her highest-charting album in the country since Blackout (2007). In Germany, the album debuted at number three, becoming her highest-charting album there in 13 years, since the release of In the Zone (2003). In Italy, the album debuted at number one, becoming Spears's first album to reach the top of the Italian album chart. The album also debuted at number one in Ireland and Taiwan. In Japan, the album peaked at number 19 on the Japanese Albums chart (Oricon) selling 2,725 copies, and debuted on the Billboard Japan Hot Albums chart at number 33. In South Korea, the album debuted at number 26 on the Gaon Album Chart and at number three on the international version of the same chart.
After Spears's tour in Korea, the album rebounded on the Gaon International Chart and reached the top of the chart, higher than its debut position. In Brazil, it had sold over 20,000 copies during its first day of release, according to Pro-Música Brasil. Additionally, the album also charted within the top ten of charts in various international countries.

Track listing 

Notes
On digital editions of the album, "Do You Wanna Come Over?" is the seventh track after "Clumsy", prior to "Slumber Party", while the rest of the songs remain in the original order. However, this does not apply to the 2020 deluxe reissue.
The album was reissued on November 16, 2016, on digital and streaming platforms to include a new version of "Slumber Party" that features Tinashe, which has the same length as the original version. However, this does not apply to the 2020 deluxe reissue.
As of September 2022, the 2016 editions of the album have been delisted from streaming services, leaving only the 2020 deluxe reissue.
 – vocal production
 – primary and vocal production
 – additional vocal production
 – co-production

2020 reissues 

Glory was reissued twice in 2020. The standard edition was reissued first, and was surprise released on May 29 via music streaming services. This reissue added the previously Japan-exclusive track "Mood Ring (By Demand)", as well as a new cover artwork. The deluxe edition received a reissue on December 4, and added the new songs "Swimming in the Stars" and "Matches"—the latter being a collaboration with the Backstreet Boys—alongside remixes of "Mood Ring". The deluxe reissue also restores the original solo version of "Slumber Party" and the original album track order.

The reissues were in response to the original version of Glory receiving a resurgence in popularity in May 2020, following a fan-led social media campaign, which led it to chart at number one on the US iTunes album chart. Spears acknowledged the fan campaign via an Instagram video message, and unveiled a new cover artwork for the standard reissue. This revised cover features Spears laying in the middle of a desert wearing a gold bathing suit, and was photographed by David LaChappelle.

Singles 
"Mood Ring (By Demand)" was released to Italian radio on July 10, 2020, as the lead single from the reissue and overall third single from the album, almost four years after its release. "Swimming in the Stars" was released to digital music providers as the reissue's second single and overall fourth single from the album on December 2, 2020, coinciding with Spears' 39th birthday. The release took critics by surprise, having been released amidst the #FreeBritney movement and Spears' work hiatus. "Matches" was issued to contemporary hit radio in Italy on December 18, 2020, as the reissue's third single and overall fifth and final single from the album.

Track listing 

Notes
 The 13-track 2020 standard reissue included "Mood Ring (By Demand)" as track 13, with the digital tracklist of the original standard edition as track 1-12. As of September 2022, this edition has been delisted from streaming services.
 – vocal production
 – primary and vocal production
 – additional vocal production
 – co-production

Personnel 

 Denisia Andrews – background vocals
 Jon Asher – vocal producer, background vocals
 Jessica Ashley – background vocals
 Venus Barr – keyboards, producer
 Erik Belz – assistant vocal engineer
 BloodPop – producer
 Julian Gramma – producer
 Dan Book – vocal producer
 Trevor Brown – background vocals
 Burns – engineer, producer
 Cashmere Cat – instrumentation, producer, programming
 Maddox Chhim – mixing assistant
 Brittany Coney – background vocals
 John Cranfield – engineer
 Alex DeGroot – assistant vocal engineer
 Aaron Dobos – vocal engineer
 Ed Drewett – background vocals
 Jason Evigan – instrumentation, producer, vocal engineer, vocal producer, background vocals
 Vanessa Evigan – background vocals
 Victoria Evigan – background vocals
 Benny Faccone – assistant engineer, assistant vocal engineer
 Oak Felder – producer, background vocals
 Robin Florent – mixing engineer
 Melanie Fontana – background vocals
 Ina Forsberg – background vocals
 Sterling Fox – guitar, background vocals
 Livvi Franc – background vocals
 Robin Fredriksson – bass, brass, drums, guitar, handclapping, kalimba, marimba, percussion, producer, programming, snaps, synthesizer, vocal engineer, vocal producer
 Michael Freeman – mixing assistant
 G-Eazy – rap vocals
 Chris Galland – mixing engineer
 Serban Ghenea – mixing
 Andrew Goldstein – engineer, keyboards, producer, programming
 Erwin Gorostiza – creative director
 Oscar Görres – bass, guitar, percussion, producer, programming, shaker, snaps, synthesizer, vocal engineer, vocal producer, background vocals
 Angella Grossi – background vocals
 John Hanes – engineer, mixing engineer
 Breyan Isaac – background vocals
 Jeff Jackson – mixing engineer
 Jermaine Jackson – background vocals
 Joe Janiak – background vocals
 Kathleen Janzen – background vocals
 Jaycen Joshua – mixing
 Ilsey Juber – background vocals
 Rob Katz – assistant vocal engineer
 Ian Kirkpatrick – producer, programming, background vocals
 Zaire Koalo – background vocals
 Dave Kutch – mastering
 Karen Kwak – A&R, executive producer
 Mattias Larsson – bass, brass, drums, guitar, handclapping, kalimba, marimba, percussion, producer, programming, snaps, synthesizer, vocal engineer, vocal producer
 Marcus Lomax – background vocals
 Kevin Luu – assistant engineer, assistant vocal engineer
 Manny Marroquin – mixing
 Nathalia Marshall – vocal production assistance
 Julia Michaels – background vocals
 Mischke Butler – vocal engineer, vocal producer, background vocals
 Nick Monson – producer
 David Nakaji – mixing assistant
 Alex Niceford – producer
 Randee St. Nicholas – photography
 Jason Patterson – assistant vocal engineer
 Phoebe Ryan – background vocals
 Linda Pritchard – background vocals
 Benjamin Rice – vocal engineer
 Talay Riley – background vocals
 Robopop – instrumentation, producer, programming
 James Royo – engineer
 Lance Shipp – podorythmie
 Venus Shipp – background vocals, assistant engineer
 Dawn Soul – background vocals, programming
 Britney Spears –  lead vocals, background vocals
 Mark "Spike" Stent – mixing
 Gavin Taylor – art direction, design
 Isaiah Tejada – assistant engineer
 Pat Thrall – vocal producer
 Carla Marie Williams – background vocals
 Tramaine "Youngfyre" Winfrey – producer, background vocals
 Sadaharu Yagi – assistant vocal engineer

Charts

Weekly charts

Year-end charts

Release history

See also 
 List of number-one albums of 2016 (Ireland)

References

External links 
 

2016 albums
Albums produced by Cashmere Cat
Albums produced by DJ Mustard
Albums produced by Jason Evigan
Albums produced by Mattman & Robin
Britney Spears albums
Contemporary R&B albums by American artists
RCA Records albums
Albums produced by Oak Felder